ESPN  operated five sports television channels in the United Kingdom and Ireland.

On 25 February 2013, BT agreed to acquire ESPN's UK and Ireland TV channels business, consisting of ESPN and ESPN America. BT will continue to broadcast ESPN after the deal's expected completion date of 31 July, as part of its BT Sport package of services. The value of the deal was not disclosed, but BT is understood to have paid "low tens of millions". ESPN Classic, which was not part of the BT deal, and ESPN America ceased transmission across Europe, the Middle East and Africa at midnight on 1 August 2013. ESPN will continue to own and operate its existing digital media businesses.

Channels
ESPN launched on in the UK on 3 August 2009. The channel marked ESPN's first foray into live coverage of domestic sports events in the UK. On 31 July 2013, BT completed their purchase of ESPN's UK and Ireland TV channels business but continue to operate ESPN, however the programming largely resembles that of ESPN America.

Programming is available in standard-definition and high-definition formats.

ESPN Player, previously branded ESPN360, is ESPN’s digital streaming platform in the UK and Europe for live and on-demand sports. The service is available across Europe, Middle East & Africa and, predominantly, broadcasts U.S sports content.  Main content includes NCAA Football, NCAA Basketball, College Sports, IndyCar Series, World Series of Poker, X Games and others. The platform is a direct to consumer service, as Pay Per View, and not linked to any TV subscription. 

ESPN America was a British-based European sports network, focusing on professional and collegiate sports of the United States and Canada. Originally launched in December 2002 as NASN (the North American Sports Network), ESPN purchased the channel in March 2007 for €70m from Benchmark Capital Europe and Setanta Sports. The channel was known as ESPN America from 1 February 2009. ESPN America broadcast a selection of top North American professional and collegiate sports leagues. The network closed at midnight on 1 August 2013.

Programming was available in standard-definition and high-definition formats.

ESPN Classic launched on 13 March 2006 on Sky channel 442, the first channel in the UK under the ESPN branding. Initially it was only available on Sky Digital but the channel became available on Virgin Media and UPC Ireland in August 2009 when ESPN UK launched. It broadcast a range of archive sports coverage, with an emphasis on football. The channel closed at midnight on 1 August 2013.

Programming was available in only standard-definition format.

Mobile
On 6 April 2010, ESPN secured mobile rights to highlights from all Premier League games from the 2010-11 season, after beating British Sky Broadcasting to the deal. The broadcaster won a three-year deal for short-form mobile highlights from all 380 Premier League games. It is thought that ESPN paid under £10m for the rights in a blind auction.

The application, titled ESPN Goals, features a basic service offering news and live scores, which is free-to-download. However, the full video clips package are chargeable on a monthly or season basis. The clips can be issued during any matches not kicking off at 3pm on Saturdays, with highlights from those games only being permitted for release after 4.45pm.

UK users are able to access the application from the Android Market, Apple App Store, BlackBerry App World, Ovi Store and Windows Phone Marketplace, along with ESPN's mobile site.

From the 2011–12 Premier League season, the app became completely free both to download and to view clips, instead relying on advertising revenue to fund the service.

From the 2013–14 Premier League season, the rights to mobile highlights have been sold to News UK, ESPN is not thought to have submitted a bid.

See also
ESPN
BT Sport ESPN
ESPN America
ESPN Classic (UK)
ESPN International

References

External links
ESPN UK channel information 
ESPN.co.uk
ESPN.co.uk Contact Details
ESPN Scrum
ESPN F1
ESPN Soccernet
ESPN Cricinfo

ESPN media outlets
Sports television in the United Kingdom